Zangeneh (also Romanized as Zanganeh) is a city and capital of Zand District, in Malayer County, Hamadan Province, Iran. At the 2006 census, its population was 844, in 242 families.

References

Populated places in Malayer County

Cities in Hamadan Province